Michael Herbert Ponich (November 20, 1905 – December 3, 1957) was a provincial politician from Alberta, Canada. He served as a member of the Legislative Assembly of Alberta from 1944 to 1955, sitting with the Social Credit caucus in government.

References

Alberta Social Credit Party MLAs
1957 deaths
1905 births